The Turkish Ambassador to the United States is the official representative of the President of Turkey and the Government of Turkey to the President of the United States and Federal government of the United States.

List of Turkish chiefs of mission to the United States

See also
 Turkey–United States relations
 Embassy of Turkey, Washington D.C.
 Ambassadors of the United States to Turkey

References

External links
 Official website of the Embassy of Turkey in Washington DC

 
Turkey
United States